Wu Shugen (Mongolian: Ündes; born 26 August 1987 in Inner Mongolia) is a female Mongol judoka from China who competed at the 2008 Summer Olympics and 2012 Summer Olympics in the Extra lightweight (under 48 kg) event. At the 2008 Summer Olympics, she lost in the quarterfinals to Ryoko Tani.  In the repechage she beat Sayaka Matsumoto, before losing to Paula Pareto.  She beat Lisa Kearney before losing to Sarah Menezes in the 2012 Summer Olympics.  In the repechage she lost to Éva Csernoviczki.

Major performances
2007 Paris Super World Cup - 1st -48 kg class

See also
China at the 2008 Summer Olympics

References

External links
 
 
 http://2008teamchina.olympic.cn/index.php/personview/personsen/5183

Chinese people of Mongolian descent
1987 births
Living people
Judoka at the 2008 Summer Olympics
Judoka at the 2012 Summer Olympics
Olympic judoka of China
Sportspeople from Inner Mongolia
Asian Games medalists in judo
Judoka at the 2010 Asian Games
Judoka at the 2014 Asian Games
Chinese female judoka
Asian Games gold medalists for China
Asian Games bronze medalists for China
Medalists at the 2010 Asian Games
Medalists at the 2014 Asian Games